The 2011 Crawley Borough Council election took place on 5 May 2011 to elect members of Crawley District Council in West Sussex, England. One third of the council was up for election and the Conservative Party stayed in overall control of the council.

After the election, the composition of the council was:
Conservative 24
Labour 13

Election result

Ward results

Bewbush

Furnace Green

Gossops Green

Ifield

Langley Green

Maidenbower

Northgate

Pound Hill North

Pound Hill North

Southgate

Three Bridges

Tilgate

References

2011 English local elections
2011
2010s in West Sussex